The Offshore Petroleum Development (Scotland) Act 1975 (1975 c. 8) is an Act of the Parliament of the United Kingdom which facilitated the onshore construction of offshore oil platforms for the UK Continental Shelf. Its provisions permitted the acquisition of land; the regulation of sea-based operations; the granting of licences for construction; the reinstatement of land; and financial provisions.

Background 
In 1975 the UK government recognised that the development of offshore oil resources would make an important contribution to the UK economy, particularly at a time when the cost of imported crude oil was increasing rapidly. An immediate objective for the government and the oil industry was the building of offshore oil platforms; their construction required significant areas of coastal land. The 1975 Act addressed these issues; it had three purposes: to ensure that land was available for onshore construction; to ensure that construction was properly regulated; and that land was restored after use.

These purposes were enacted by the 1975 Act in detail as follows. Sections 1 and 2 and Schedules 1 and 2 of the Act empowered the Secretary of State of Scotland to acquire any land in Scotland for the purpose of platform construction. Sections 3 to 7 and Schedule 3 allowed the control and regulation of sea-based operations. The Secretary of State was empowered to make Sea Designation Orders and to grant licences for operations. Sections 8 and 9 required the reinstatement of land after construction activities, and provided planning authorities with powers to require a developer to reinstate land. Section 10 empowered the Secretary of State to carry out works on land for construction purposes or to contribute to their cost. Section 11 enabled the Secretary of State to make loans, or to guarantee the repayment of loans, to assist with construction operations. Section 12 enabled an acquisition order to be made in relation to any land, even land which was held "inalienably". The other substantive Sections of the Act included provisions for compensation for nuisance; to require information about land to be made available; and the rights of entry; and financial provisions.

The Government regarded the 1975 Act as a significant part of its oil strategy. The oil field developments encompassed by this legislation were crucial to the UK economy but had significant local social and environmental implications. The Act allowed developments to proceed with appropriate controls and safeguards.

Offshore Petroleum Development (Scotland) Act 1975 
The Offshore Petroleum Development (Scotland) Act 1975 (1975 c. 8) received Royal Assent on 13 March 1975. Its long title is ‘An Act to provide for the acquisition by the Secretary of State of land in Scotland for purposes relating to exploration for and exploitation of offshore petroleum; to enable the Secretary of State to carry out works and facilitate operations for those purposes; to regulate such operations in certain sea areas; to provide for the reinstatement of land used for those purposes; and for purposes connected with those matters.'

Provisions 
The Act comprises 20 Sections under 4 headings and 3 Schedules:

 Acquisition of land for purposes of offshore petroleum development
 Section 1. Acquisition of land for purposes connected with offshore petroleum
 Section 2. Extinction of rights affecting land
 Designated sea areas
 Section 3. Designated sea areas
 Section 4. Licences in relation to operations in designated sea areas
 Section 5. Terms and effect, etc. of licences under s. 4
 Section 6. Regulations for protection and control of operations in designated sea areas
 Section 7. Execution and enforcement of regulations, etc. in designated sea areas
 Reinstatement of land
 Section 8. Reinstatement of land held under Act
 Section 9. Arrangements to ensure reinstatement of other land developed for purposes connected with offshore petroleum
 Miscellaneous and general
 Section 10. Execution of works and disposal of land held under Act
 Section 11. Loans and guarantees by Secretary of State for facilitating relevant operations
 Section 12. Supplementary provisions as to acquisition and appropriation of land
 Section 13. Compensation for adjoining owners and exclusion of actions for nuisance
 Section 14. Power to require information as to interests in land
 Section 15. Rights of entry
 Section 16. Application to Crown land
 Section 17. Financial provisions
 Section 18. Savings
 Section 19. Orders, etc.
 Section 20. Short title, interpretation and extent
 Schedules
 Schedule 1. Making and Revocation of Expedited Acquisition Orders
 Schedule 2. Effect of Expedited Acquisition Orders
 Schedule 3. Making and Revocation of Sea Designation Orders

Effects and Status 
By July 1975 the investment under the Act totalled £3.5 million.

The provisions of the Act included the following construction yards which were in  use from the mid-1970s to the early-1990s.

The 1975 Act is still (in 2020) in force. Only minor amendments and textural changes have been made by subsequent legislation.

See also 

 Petroleum Act

References 

History of the petroleum industry in the United Kingdom
United Kingdom Acts of Parliament 1975